Erguer. Estudantes da Galiza (Erguer, Wake Up. Students of Galiza in Galician language) is a Galician student union that advocates for a public, democratic, galician language, quality and antipatriarchal education. Any high school, vocational training or university student can join Erguer. Erguer also advocates for Galician independence and a Republic of Galicia.

History
Erguer was born on 5 March 2016, at the "Colexio de Fonseca" (University of Santiago de Compostela), as the merger of the three previous nationalist student organisations, Galician Student League, AGIR and Comités. Its first public action after the foundational assembly was to call for a student strike in all Galiza for 13 April.

References

External links
Official website
Galician Nationalist Bloc
Secessionist organizations in Europe
2016 establishments in Galicia (Spain)
Galician nationalism
Socialism
Student organisations in Spain